Mirko Čikiriz is a Serbian politician. At one time a prominent member of the Serbian Renewal Movement (Srpski pokret obnove, SPO), he joined the breakaway Movement for the Restoration of the Kingdom of Serbia (Pokret obnove Kraljevine Srbije, POKS) in 2017. That organization split in late 2021, and Čikiriz became a prominent figure in the party faction led by Žika Gojković.

Čikiriz has been an assistant mayor of Kragujevac since November 2020, with responsibility for co-operation with churches and religious communities.

Early life and career
Čikiriz was born in the small town of Guča, Lučani, in what was then the People's Republic of Serbia in the People's Federal Republic of Yugoslavia. He graduated from the University of Kragujevac Faculty of Law in 1988, passed the bar exam in 1995, and worked at law in Kragujevac. From 1998 to 2008, he was the legal representative and head of the legal service for Takovo osiguranje in the city.

Politician

Early years
Čikiriz's family has a long history of involvement in Serbian royalist politics. His ancestors were supporters of the Karađorđević dynasty in the nineteenth century, and Draža Mihailović kept his military headquarters in the house of Čikiriz's grandmother for twenty days during World War II. Several members of his family were shot by German forces during the Axis occupation of Serbia.

Čikiriz joined the SPO on its formation in 1990. He was arrested with party leader Vuk Drašković following street protests against Slobodan Milošević's administration in June 1993; on his release, he organized further protests for the benefit of those party members still incarcerated. Čikiriz became a member of the SPO Kragujevac city board in 1996, and in 1997–98 he served as secretary of the municipal assembly and the municipal administration in the nearby municipality of Lapovo. He later became president of the SPO's Kragujevac board and a member of its presidency for the Šumadija District.

Parliamentarian
Čikiriz was a candidate in the Serbian parliamentary elections of 2000, 2003, and 2007, although he was not elected on any of these occasions. The SPO's electoral list did not cross the electoral threshold in 2000 or 2007. In 2003, the party ran a combined list with New Serbia (Nova Srbija, NS) that won twenty-two seats. Čikiriz appeared in the 114th position on the combined list of the parties and was not afterward included in the SPO's delegation. (From 2000 to 2011, assembly mandates were awarded to sponsoring parties or coalitions rather than to individual candidates, and it was common practice for the mandates to be assigned out of numerical order. Čikiriz could have been given a mandate despite his low position on the list, but he was not.)

The SPO contested the 2008 Serbian parliamentary election as part of the For a European Serbia (Za evropsku Srbiju, ZES) alliance led by the Democratic Party (Demokratska stranka, DS). Čikiriz was included on the alliance's (mostly alphabetical) list in the 242th position and was given a mandate when ZES won a plurality victory with 102 seats out of 250. The overall results of the election were inconclusive, but ZES ultimately formed a coalition government with the Socialist Party of Serbia (Socijalistička partija Srbije, SPS), and the SPO supported the administration. In his first assembly term, Čikiriz was a member of the legislative committee; a deputy member of the committee on youth and sports, the committee for relations with Serbs outside Serbia, and the poverty reduction committee; and a member of the parliamentary friendship groups with Australia, Belgium, Norway, and Portugal.

Čikiriz was also elected to the Kragujevac city assembly on the ZES alliance's list in the 2008 Serbian local elections. His term was brief; he resigned from the city assembly on 10 October 2008.

Serbia's electoral system was reformed in 2011, such that mandates were awarded to candidates on successful lists in numerical order. The SPO contested the 2012 Serbian parliamentary election in an alliance with the Liberal Democratic Party (Liberalno demokratska partija, LDP) known as U-Turn (Preokret). Čikiriz received the seventeenth position on the alliance's list and was re-elected when it won nineteen seats. The Serbian Progressive Party (Srpska napredna stranka, SNS) won the election and afterward formed a new coalition government with the SPS and other parties; the SPO served in opposition. Čikiriz was a member of the committee on constitutional affairs and legislation; a member of the committee on the rights of the child; a deputy member of the committee on finance, state budget, and control of public spending; a deputy member of the committee on administrative-budgetary and mandate-immunity issues; and a member of the friendship groups with Japan, Slovenia, South Korea, and the Sovereign Order of Malta.

The SPO joined the SNS's political alliance in the buildup to the 2014 parliamentary election. Čikiriz received the ninety-second position on the alliance's Aleksandar Vučić — Future We Believe In list and was elected to a third term when the alliance won a landslide victory with 158 seats. During his third term, Čikiriz was a member of the committee on constitutional affairs and legislation and the committee on the rights of the child; a deputy member of the committee on administrative-budgetary and mandate-immunity issues, the committee for Kosovo and Metohija, the health and family committee, the committee on defence and internal affairs, and the committee on finance, state budget, and control of public spending; a deputy member of Serbia's delegation to the Parliamentary Assembly of the Organization for Security and Co-operation in Europe (OSCE PA); and a member of the friendship groups with Australia, the Czech Republic, Denmark, France, Italy, Japan, Slovenia, South Korea, Spain, and the United States of America.

He received the 134th position on the SNS-led Aleksandar Vučić – Serbia Is Winning list in the 2016 parliamentary election and narrowly missed re-election when the list won 131 mandates. He was later appointed as a state secretary in Serbia's ministry of justice. As none of the SPO's three elected members left the assembly prior to the 2020 election, Čikiriz did not have the opportunity to return as a replacement.

Čikiriz was a vice-president of the SPO at the time that he left the party in 2017.

POKS member
The SPO split in 2017, and a new party called the Movement for the Restoration of the Kingdom of Serbia (POKS) was formed under Žika Gojković's leadership. Čikiriz joined the POKS; in so doing, he said that its founders were dissatisfied with Vuk Drašković's continued leadership of SPO but did not want to attempt a disruptive takeover of that party. Čikiriz also accused Drašković of singling out the crimes committed by Serb forces in the Yugoslav Wars of the 1990s and ignoring the crimes of other sides. The POKS initially continued to support Serbia's SNS-led administration, and Čikiriz remained in his role as a state secretary.

In 2019, the Kragujevac city assembly voted to name an alley after Draža Mihailović. Čikiriz supported this decision, describing both Mihailović's Chetniks and the Yugoslav Partisans as having been anti-fascist forces in World War II.

He appeared in the third position on the POKS's For the Kingdom of Serbia electoral list in the 2020 Serbian parliamentary election. The list narrowly missed crossing the electoral threshold. He also led the POKS's list for Kragujevac in the concurrent 2020 Serbian local elections and was elected when the list won three mandates. Once again, his term in the local assembly was relatively brief. He was appointed as an assistant mayor on 5 November 2020, with responsibility for co-operation with churches and religious communities. (The city's other assistant mayors had been appointed in September, but Čikiriz was required to wait until the end of his term as a state secretary before he could formally take office.) By virtue of holding this executive role, he was required to resign from the city assembly, which he did on 27 November. In May 2021, he introduced a contract valued at seven million dollars to be spent on financing and co-financing projects sponsored by the city's different religious communities.

POKS split and 2022 parliamentary election
The POKS split into rival factions in late 2021, respectively led by Žika Gojković and former Belgrade mayor Vojislav Mihailović. For several months, both Gojković and Mihailović claimed to be the legitimate leader of the party. Čikiriz was one of Gojković's most prominent allies in this intra-party division. On 28 December 2021, the group centered around Mihailović formally expelled both Gojković and Čikiriz from the POKS, a decision that they rejected as invalid.

Gojković's POKS group contested the 2022 Serbian parliamentary election in an alliance with Dveri, and Čikiriz received the twelfth position on their combined electoral list. The list won ten seats, and he was not immediately elected. Shortly after the election, Gojković's group lost the rights to the POKS name when Mihailović was formally recognized as the party's leader.

Čikiriz is currently the next candidate slated to enter the national assembly if any of the four candidates elected for Gojković's POKS leave the assembly in its current term.

References

1963 births
Living people
People from Lučani
Politicians from Kragujevac
Members of the National Assembly (Serbia)
Deputy Members of the Parliamentary Assembly of the Organization for Security and Co-operation in Europe
Serbian Renewal Movement politicians
Movement for the Restoration of the Kingdom of Serbia politicians